Abortion in Kazakhstan is legal as an elective procedure up to 12 weeks, and special circumstances afterwards. The relevant legislation is based on the laws inherited from the country's Soviet past, when abortion was legally permitted as a contraceptive.

Laws 
The laws regulating abortion in Kazakhstan are the Reproductive Rights Law (2004), the Criminal Code (1997) and the Ministry of Health Medical and Social Indications for Abortion (2008).

Abortion is legal in the following cases:

 If the pregnant woman's health is at risk in one of the following ways, the approval of a committee of three health professionals (a gynecologist, the head of the institution, and an expert on her condition) is required, and that the illness be on an approved list.
 If the woman's life is at risk, with no limit as to gestational age.
 If the woman's health could be significantly harmed, with no limit as to gestational age.
 If the woman's mental health is at risk.
 Upon request, for whatever reason, including reasons such as pregnancy from an incestuous relationship.
 If the pregnant woman has a cognitive or intellectual disability.
 Pregnancy in a minor, requiring parental permission or that of another adult.

Legal abortions are provided in private centers, Women's Consulting Centers, Maternity Houses, Polyclinics with Women's Consulting Offices, many hospitals and Family Group Practices. Second-trimester abortions can only be performed in perinatal centers, maternity houses and multi-regional hospitals.

The state provides measures to ensure that abortions are safe, and obliges a pregnant woman considering an abortion to be assessed. Providers of illegal abortions are sanctioned. Contraceptives are provided following an abortion.

History 
Information on the prevalence of abortion in Kazakhstan comes primarily from two sources: the Ministry of Health and the Demographic and Health Survey of Kazakhstan. High-quality surveys and other data are available, since the procedure has been legal for some time. However, reports are occasionally contradictory.

Soviet Kazakhstan 
For most of the 20th century, due to state support, the main method of contraception used in the Soviet Union was abortion.

In 1920, the Soviet Union legalized abortion upon request as a temporary measure, because in the state of economic crisis, legal abortions would be a necessary measure to ensure sanitary conditions. In Kazakhstan, the native Kazakhs were opposed. Over the following decade, anti-abortion would be an important current among Kazakhs, framed as a cultural bastion attacked by Soviet (generally Slavic) officials. Even during the period of legalization, Russian authorities applauded Kazakh resistance to abortion. Physicians warned that there were health risks associated with frequent resort to abortion. During the period when abortion was legal, it was not practiced as legislators had intended – clinics did not receive funding and patients were forced to pay. Abortions were mainly had by ethnic Russian women in the Kazakhstan region (a mere 0.002% of abortions were performed on ethnic Kazakh women, primarily in urban areas).

For Kazakhs, abortion was taboo, although there were traditional methods practiced involving herbal abortifacients. The number of abortions performed increased in Kazakhstan as it did in Russia, with a particular increase between 1927 and 1928 provoked by the increase in available information about the surgical procedure and the change in morality. Illegal abortions began to decline and the increased abortion rate began to worry officials, such that officials began to distrust the practice of legal abortion, which led to it being banned.

Illegal abortions occurred when doctors refused to perform abortions for one of the following health reasons: pregnancies past the first trimester, first pregnancies, or for those with dangerous medical conditions. The fact that legally available abortions did not totally eliminate illegal abortions contributed to the Soviet decision to criminalize. At the start of the 1930s, Soviet officials openly criticized abortion and its legalization. In peripheral areas of the USSR, including Kazakhstan, there was concern over the effects of sudden prohibition among those who defended a gradual prohibition and even education about other contraceptive methods.

The period of legality ended on June 27, 1936, with "The Decree in Defense of Mother and Child", a law under which abortions could only be performed for patients whose lives were in danger. Illegal abortions did not guarantee safe, sanitary conditions. The regional (oblast) government established a system of controls to ensure the law was obeyed: physicians had to declare their practices, sending a request to end a pregnancy to be reviewed by a monthly committee.

Illegalization reinforced women's traditional roles in a patriarchal social situation, as it reinforced the idea of women as mothers and thus good patriots according to Soviet expectations. The press was used as a propaganda tool against women who underwent illegal abortions, depicting them as capricious enemies of the motherland. As Kazakh women rarely chose to have abortions, they were not targeted by legal persecution. Women who went to hospitals with symptoms suggesting abortion were investigated. Doctors who practiced illegal abortions could be imprisoned for up to three years. There are no reliable sources as to this clandestine activity but evidence from the archives, contrary to the cased treated in the press, shows that women found undergoing illegal abortions were generally unmarried.

In one case in 1940, eleven women with symptoms typical of attempted abortion were detained and separated from their families, underwent state scrutiny and faced public humiliation. They were later cleared of all charges.

Due to a lack of presence on the ground, anti-abortion propaganda struggled to reach the people. The campaign's impact is difficult to measure as there is little evidence of effect to be found.

In the post-war period, it became evident that the propaganda effort had failed to reduce abortions. Following the death of Joseph Stalin in 1953, the state stopped chasing illegal abortions and physicians practiced abortions in the first trimester upon request. In 1968, the Soviet Union once again legalized abortion upon request.

Independent Kazakhstan 

Beginning with its independence from the USSR in 1991, Kazakhstan began to replace abortion with other methods of contraception. The relevant legislation in Kazakhstan has been influenced by the country's Soviet past. Despite the decline in abortions in favor of other contraceptive methods, abortion remained the most widely used contraceptive method in the 1990s. Since the country's independence, abortions are increasingly performed in the private sector, leading the official rate of abortions to decline.

A study based on the data between 1995 and 1999 found that abortions are mostly performed in urban areas, the then capital Almaty and the North and East regions of the country. Most women having abortions were ethnic Russians. Areas with a higher rate of education saw a greater fall in the use of abortion. Married women make up almost the entirety of women who have abortions since premarital sex is much less common in predominantly Muslim countries. The reason for having an abortion is primarily to limit births as well as to increase the time between births. First pregnancies are rarely aborted in the country.

The probability that a pregnancy would be aborted was 36.8%. The percentage of pregnancies resulting from contraceptive failure leading to abortion was 67%. The Demographic and Health Survey of Kazakhstan asked 3,771 women if they would have an abortion in case of accidental pregnancy and 35.6% responded in the affirmative, 20.6% were not sure and the rest replied in the negative.

In February 1994, a family planning program was approved which established a family planning service in medical institutions to try to reduce abortions and maternal mortality.

Between 1993 and 1997, the United Nations funded reproductive health in the country, with one of its primary aims being reducing the abortion rate.

Between 1995 and 1999 abortions were officially free, but in practice, people were obliged to pay, with prices between 8 and US$20. These payments were generally not made in rural areas. In 1995, a wide-reaching campaign warned of the health risk of illegal abortions.

The laws remained essentially the same between 1996 and 2013.

In 1999, the vacuum aspiration technique was used in nearly half of all abortions in Kazakhstan.

In 2000, a country-wide government program was approved to reduce abortions. The program trained medical professionals and informed the population about other contraceptive methods.

A UN report published in 2002 explained that abortions were available on request during the first trimester, with no particular motivation required; between 12 and 28 weeks, the service is available if certain social or medical circumstances are present.

In 2001, a Health Ministry order was approved on the medical reasons and regulations of abortion. In 2009, the ministry approved Order 626, which was modified in 2012 regarding the following aspects:

Legal abortions are practiced in private centers, Women's Consulting Centers, Maternity Houses, Polyclinics with Women's Consulting Offices, many hospitals and Family Group Practices. The successful reduction of the abortion rate was due to the efforts in education, information and communication (like the Red Apple campaign on social media) which encouraged the population to use modern contraceptive methods. However, the abortion rate among Russians went down 33% while among Kazakhs, the decrease was much smaller.

The medications used to induce abortion are Mifepristone and Misoprostol.

There is a high rate of abortion among teenagers.

The Kazakh Association on Sexual and Reproductive Health stated in 2009 and 2012 that medical abortions were only practiced in Almaty in private centers and that the establishment of services in state medical centers was being considered the latter year. It also declared that in 2007, there were 11,666 abortions in the city of Almaty, of which 74.3% were performed using dilation and curettage. The average price among private practitioners was 5000 KZT ($41) in 2009 and $200 in 2012.

A 2007 investigation concluded that the high abortion rate could be caused by limited access to health services, especially in rural regions. Intrauterine devices are commonly used as a contraceptive in Kazakhstan without professional help, as there are few available methods. This may be why the primary contraceptive method used in the country is abortion.

A 2010 report found that the state provided no information on sexual and reproductive health, including abortion.

A 2011 report found that the rates of teenage pregnancy and back-alley abortions were leading to deaths, primarily caused by a lack of specific preventative programs.

Statistics

Historical abortion statistics 
Definition of table data:

 Live births.
 Abortions, reported includes legal reported induced abortions.
 Abortions (AWR) are combined reported and estimated abortion occurrences from the Abortion Worldwide Report and working papers.
 Abortions, residents, in country only includes reported abortions obtained within the country by residents only.
 Abortions, residents, obtained abroad includes reported abortions by country residents obtained in other countries.
 Abortions, residents, total includes reported abortions by residents, obtained both within the country and abroad.
 Fetal deaths generally includes fetal deaths or stillbirths of at least 20 weeks` gestation.
 Miscarriages generally includes spontaneous fetal losses/ abortions, fetal deaths, or stillbirths, regardless of gestation period.
 Abortion ratio is abortions per 1000 live births.
 Abortion % is abortions as percentage of pregnancies (excluding fetal deaths/miscarriages).
 Abortion rate, residents is abortions by residency per 1000 women ages 15–49.
 Abortion rate, occurrences (AWR) is abortion occurrences from Abortion Worldwide Report figures per 1000 women ages 15–39.

*last updated 14 January 2020

Abortions by region 

*last updated 11 April 201

References and notes

Bibliography 

 
 
 
 
 
 
 

Healthcare in Kazakhstan
Kazakhstan
Kazakhstan
Women in Kazakhstan
Women's rights in Kazakhstan